Guy Granet (21 September 1887 – 20 November 1953) was a British sports shooter. He competed in the 50 m pistol event at the 1948 Summer Olympics.

References

1887 births
1953 deaths
British male sport shooters
Olympic shooters of Great Britain
Shooters at the 1948 Summer Olympics
Sportspeople from Ipswich